George Wilfred Stocks (August 1913 — August 1993) was an Anglo-Argentine first-class cricketer.

Stocks was born in Argentina in August 1913. He was educated in England at Denstone College, before returning to Argentina following the completion of his education. Stocks played first-class cricket for Argentina in December 1937 and January 1938, making two appearances against Sir T. E. W. Brinckman's XI. Playing as a bowler in the Argentine side, he took 4 wickets in his two matches, with best figures of 3 for 51. As a tailend batsman, he scored 17 runs with a highest score of 9 not out. Stocks died in Argentina in August 1993.

References

External links

1913 births
1993 deaths
Argentine people of English descent
People educated at Denstone College
Argentine cricketers